Mediala is a genus of moths of the family Erebidae. The genus was erected by Michael Fibiger in 2008.

Species
Mediala bipars (Hampson, 1907)
Mediala spectaculoides Fibiger, 2008

References

Micronoctuini
Noctuoidea genera